The 2024 United States House of Representatives elections will be held on November 5, 2024, as part of the 2024 United States elections, to elect representatives from all 435 congressional districts across each of the 50 U.S. states, as well as six non-voting delegates from the District of Columbia and the inhabited U.S. territories. Special elections may also be held on various dates throughout 2024. Numerous other federal, state, and local elections, including the U.S. presidential election and elections to the Senate, will also be held on this date. The winners of this election will serve in the 119th United States Congress, with seats apportioned among the states based on the 2020 United States census.

With the election of Hakeem Jeffries as leader of the House Democratic Caucus, this is set to be the first House election since 2002 in which the Democratic Party will not be led by Nancy Pelosi. Jeffries is the first African-American representative in the history of Congress to serve as leader of either party, and the first from New York since Bertrand Snell's retirement in 1938.

Retirements
As of March 2023, eight representatives (five Democrats and three Republicans) have announced their retirement, seven of whom are retiring to run for the U.S. Senate.

Democratic 
: Ruben Gallego is retiring to run for U.S. senator.
: Barbara Lee is retiring to run for U.S. senator.
: Adam Schiff is retiring to run for U.S. senator.
: Katie Porter is retiring to run for U.S. senator.
: Elissa Slotkin is retiring to run for U.S. senator.

Republican
: Jim Banks is retiring to run for U.S. senator.
: Victoria Spartz is retiring.
: Alex Mooney is retiring to run for U.S. senator.

Crossover seats 
This is a list of congressional seats that voted for one party in the 2020 presidential election and another in the 2022 House elections.

Democratic 
This lists the districts in which Donald Trump won in 2020 but are represented by Democrats:

Republican 
This lists the districts in which Joe Biden won in 2020 but are represented by Republicans:

Election ratings 
Several sites and individuals publish ratings of competitive seats. The seats listed below are considered competitive (not "safe" or "solid") by at least one of the rating groups. These ratings are based upon factors such as the strength of the incumbent (if the incumbent is running for re-election), the strength of the candidates, and the partisan history of the district (the Cook Partisan Voting Index (CPVI) is one example of this metric). Each rating describes the likelihood of a given outcome in the election.

Most election ratings use:
 Tossup: no advantage
 Tilt (sometimes used): very slight advantage
 Lean: significant, but not overwhelming advantage
 Likely: strong, but not certain advantage
 Safe or Solid: outcome is nearly certain

The following is the latest published ratings for competitive seats.

Alabama

Alaska

Arizona

Arkansas

California

Colorado

Connecticut

Delaware

Florida

Georgia

Hawaii

Idaho

Illinois

Indiana

Iowa

Kansas

Kentucky

Louisiana

Maine

Maryland

Massachusetts

Michigan

Minnesota

Mississippi

Missouri

Montana

Nebraska

Nevada

New Hampshire

New Jersey

New Mexico

New York

North Carolina

North Dakota

Ohio

Oklahoma

Oregon

Pennsylvania

Rhode Island

South Carolina

South Dakota

Tennessee

Texas

Utah

Vermont

Virginia

Washington

West Virginia

Wisconsin

Wyoming

Non-voting delegates

See also 
 2024 United States elections
 2024 United States gubernatorial elections
 2024 United States presidential election
 2024 United States Senate elections
 118th United States Congress
 119th United States Congress

Notes

References